Lade (Old Norse: Hlaðir) is a neighborhood in the city of Trondheim in Trøndelag county, Norway.  It is in the borough of Østbyen, just northeast of the city centre of Midtbyen and north of the Lademoen neighborhood.  Lade is located on a peninsula bordering the Trondheimsfjord, an important waterway dating back to the Viking Age. It is the site of the historic Lade estate (Lade gaard) and of Lade Church (Lade kirke), which dates to around 1190.

History

Historically, the Lade estate (Lade Storgård i Trondheim) was the seat of the Jarls of Lade (Ladejarler), a dynasty of rulers of Trøndelag and Hålogaland who were influential from the 9th century to the 11th century. The Lade estate then became crown property and sometime in the Middle Ages passed into the control of Bakke Abbey. After the abbey was dissolved in 1537 during the Reformation, the estate crown property once again.

The present farm buildings on the Lade estate were erected in 1811 at the direction of Hilmar Meincke Krohg. The farm was purchased by the city of Trondheim in 1917. From 1922 until 1960, it was the site of the Norwegian College of Teaching in Trondheim, now Norwegian College of General Sciences. In 1992, the farm was acquired by the Reitan Group. The buildings were restored and became their headquarters in 1995.

Another former estate at Lade, Ringve gård, is now the Ringve Museum, the national museum of music. Ringve Botanical Garden is also at Lade.

The Norwegian University of Science and Technology formerly had a campus at Lade; the buildings have been repurposed.

Most of Lade is now suburban housing, superstores, industry, and some recreational areas, and is zoned for high car access. There are twosecondary schools: Ladejarlen Secondary School and Ringve Secondary School. Other institutions located at Lade include the shopping centre City Lade and the Norwegian Geological Survey.

Lade has one of the few beaches in Trondheim. It has become a popular area with high housing prices.

Public transportation
Lade is connected to Lademoen by the Nordland Line, but only two stations offer services to Lade: Haakon VII Ave and Rotvoll. In 1958, the Ladelinjen tramway was built from Lade to Prinsensgate, but in 1988 the line was closed with the rest of the Trondheim Tramway because the city of Trondheim did not have adequate funding to keep it going. Some sections have not been removed and can still be seen.

Notable residents
Lade has many locally famous people living in it. Footballer Per Ciljan Skjelbred grew up there and built a house there. The multi-millionaire members of the Reitan family also live there.

See also
 Våttahaugen

References

Geography of Trondheim
Neighbourhoods of Trondheim
Viking Age populated places